Cry Danger is a 1951 film noir thriller film, starring Dick Powell and Rhonda Fleming. The film was directed by Robert Parrish, a former child star and later editor in his debut as a director.

Plot
Rocky Mulloy was sentenced to life in prison for a robbery and murder that he did not commit. He is released five years later when an "eyewitness", a one-legged ex-Marine named Delong, suddenly appears and provides a fake alibi. Delong is an opportunist who figures out that by freeing Rocky he can get a share of the missing $100,000 from the robbery. Rocky insists he was not involved and sets out to find out who framed him, hoping to free his friend Danny Morgan, still in prison for the same crime. Police Lieutenant Gus Cobb meets Rocky when he arrives in Los Angeles and tells him that he will be under 24-hour surveillance.

Rocky and Delong rent a place in a trailer park. Morgan's wife Nancy, a former girlfriend of Rocky's, lives there. Delong meets Darlene, a pretty resident.

Rocky knows that bookie Louis Castro is the mastermind behind the robbery and believes that he also the person who framed him and sent him to prison. He demands $50,000 at gunpoint; he was earning $20,000 a year when he was imprisoned, and figures Castro owes him half that for each year he spent in prison. Castro instead gives him $500 to bet on a longshot on a fixed horse race. The next day Rocky tries to find a witness who testified against him at his trial. He finds Mrs. Fletcher who tells him her husband has died two years earlier. She also tells him that after testifying at the trial her husband "inherited" $5,000.

Rocky then goes collect his winnings from the horse race. But after he spends some of the money, Cobb informs him that the money is from the payroll robbery and takes it back. Rocky realizes that Castro has framed him again, but when Cobb calls Castro to check his story, Castro blunders. He claims he did not even know Rocky was free again, which Cobb knows is a lie, because he tailed Rocky to Castro's office the night before.

Later, two men mistake Delong and his girlfriend Darlene for Rocky and Nancy. Delong is injured and Darlene is killed. Rocky then forces Castro to play Russian roulette, with the gun pointed at the bookie's head, until Castro breaks down and reveals half the robbery money is hidden in a safe under his desk. He also claims that Rocky's friend Morgan participated in the robbery and committed the murder and that Nancy knows the truth and has her husband's share. Rocky orders Castro to telephone Cobb and tell him he will make a full confession. Castro instead calls his henchmen, the ones who killed Darlene. However, Rocky is not fooled. He calls Cobb himself, and the two killers walk into a police trap.

Then Rocky goes to see Nancy and tells her he could not find Castro. Nancy confesses she has the money. She says she loves him and begs him to run away with her and the loot. Rocky pretends to agree, but when he finds Cobb waiting outside Nancy's trailer, Rocky tells him where she has hidden the money and walks away.

Cast
 Dick Powell as Rocky Mulloy 
 Rhonda Fleming as Nancy Morgan 
 Richard Erdman as Delong
 William Conrad as Louie Castro 
 Regis Toomey as Detective Lt. Gus Cobb 
 Jean Porter as Darlene LaVonne 
 Jay Adler as Williams, Trailer Park Manager
 Joan Banks as Alice Fletcher
 Hy Averback as Harry, Bookie

Production

The film was shot in the Bunker Hill section of Los Angeles. The "Crosley" Hotel, built as the Nugent, stood at 3rd and Grand. The Los Amigos bar was at 3rd and Olive. Clover Trailer Park was not in Bunker Hill, but was at 650-700 N. Hill Place in Chinatown. Also seen is "China City", a Chinese-themed spinoff of LA's Olvera Street, no longer extant, 500 feet north of Olvera Strest at   Alameda Street.

Reception

When the film was first released, the staff at Variety magazine liked the film and said, "All the ingredients for a suspenseful melodrama are contained in Cry Danger...Robert Parrish, erstwhile film editor, makes a strong directorial bow.

Time Outs modern on-line magazine review says: "it's the kind of movie in which, told to expect someone extra for dinner, delicious Fleming smiles 'OK, I'll put more water in the soup'.  With excellent support players like a young, thin (for him) William Conrad and Jay Adler, this is a fast, crisp and laconic delight."

Restoration and 2011 re-release
A restored version of the film was released in 2011. The film was restored by the UCLA Film & Television Archive, in cooperation with Paramount Pictures (keeper of the Republic Pictures/Melange Pictures backlog, which this film is a part of), and Warner Bros. (rightsholder via Turner Entertainment of the library of original distributor RKO), funded by the Film Noir Foundation. The new print was made "from two 35mm acetate composite master positives."

The restoration premiered at the UCLA Festival of Preservation on March 14, 2011 and was screened at other North American cities in 2011 including  Vancouver.

References

External links

 
 
 
 

1951 films
1951 crime drama films
1950s thriller films
American crime drama films
American crime thriller films
American black-and-white films
1950s English-language films
Film noir
Films set in Los Angeles
Films shot in Los Angeles
RKO Pictures films
Films directed by Robert Parrish
Films scored by Emil Newman
Films scored by Paul Dunlap
1951 directorial debut films
1950s American films